Isochariesthes francoisi is a species of beetle in the family Cerambycidae. It was described by Stephan von Breuning in 1972, originally under the genus Pseudochariesthes.

Subspecies
 Isochariesthes francoisi decempunctata Adlbauer, 1997
 Isochariesthes francoisi francoisi (Breuning, 1972)

References

francoisi
Beetles described in 1972